Super Discount 2 is the third solo album by French DJ and producer Étienne de Crécy.  It was released in 2004 through Disques Solid. The album is a sequel to de Crécy's influential 1996 album Super Discount.

Each track title is the name of a peer to peer file sharing protocol, some of which are no longer operating. Production credits are also given to other major French house producers. On "Poisoned" de Crécy is joined by Philippe Zdar AKA Cassius. On "Fast Track" Alex Gopher and Julien Delfaud are credited. Gopher also co-produced "Overnet". The late DJ Mehdi worked on "Gifted" and Boom Bass on "Bit Torrent". "G2" was the sole work of Mr. Learn with de Crécy not credited on the track.

Track listing
 "Poisoned" – 5:37 (Philippe Zdar & Etienne De Crécy)
 "Fast Track" – 7:38 (Julien Delfaud, Alex Gopher & Etienne De Crécy)
 "Grokster" – 6:29 (Étienne de Crécy)
 "Morpheus" – 3:33 (Étienne de Crécy)
 "Bit Torrent" – 5:48 (Boom Bass & Etienne De Crécy)
 "Audio Galaxy" – 5:06 (Étienne de Crécy)
 "Soul Seek" – 5:37 (Étienne de Crécy)
 "Gifted" – 3:52 (DJ Mehdi & Etienne De Crécy)
 "G2" – 1:02 (Mr. Learn)
 "Limewire" – 5:51 (Étienne de Crécy)
 "Overnet" – 8:53 (Alex Gopher & Etienne De Crécy)

Charts

References

2004 albums
Étienne de Crécy albums